Karin Dor (born Kätherose Derr; 22 February 1938 – 6 November 2017) was a German actress. She was famous to international audiences for her role as Bond girl Helga Brandt in the James Bond film You Only Live Twice (1967) and her appearance in the Alfred Hitchcock thriller Topaz (1969).

Biography
Dor was born in Wiesbaden. She starred in the James Bond movie You Only Live Twice (1967) and the Alfred Hitchcock movie Topaz (1969).

She appeared in German movies adapted from the works of Edgar Wallace (Krimis from Kriminalfilm) and Karl May. These two-film series were mainly directed by Harald Reinl, her first husband. 

In 2008, she was in a Munich stage production, Man liebt nur dreimal ("You Only Love Thrice"). In later years, she performed mainly stage roles but still appeared in some films.

She was married three times: her last marriage was to George Robotham, an American stunt director, from 1988 until his death in 2007. The couple lived in Los Angeles and Munich. Her previous marriage was to Harald Reinl (1954–68); the couple had a child. In 1954, the year of their marriage, Dor was 16 years old (born 1938), while Reinl was 46 (born 1908).

Accident and death

In July 2016 while vacationing in South Tyrol, Dor was knocked to the ground after being accidentally rammed by a woman with a stroller. The backwards fall onto concrete resulted in a gashing 4-cm head wound that had to be stitched in hospital. She also lost her memory for the duration of an hour. According to Dor, the doctors detected neither a brain concussion nor an intracranial injury. Only during rehearsals for the theatre play Der Dressierte Mann weeks after her fall did doctors realize her injuries were more serious than previously thought, as she began suffering from headaches and was often tired. Even months past the accident, the aftereffects were still present and Dor was not feeling up to her usual energetic self. Her attitude however remained positive and, despite her doctors advising against it, she continued working as an actress.

Between October and November 2016, she appeared on stage every evening performing at the Komödie im Bayerischen Hof in Munich. By that time, she was already experiencing limited motor function in her right leg.

Suddenly, in January 2017, she relapsed. Her condition rapidly worsened in March 2017 and she was confined to a care home, where she ultimately died on 6 November, aged 79.

Selected filmography

References

External links
 

1938 births
2017 deaths
German film actresses
German stage actresses
People from Wiesbaden
20th-century German actresses
21st-century German actresses
People from Hesse-Nassau